The 19167 / 19168 Sabarmati Express is an express train which connects the city of Ahmedabad in the western state of Gujarat to Varanasi city in the northern state of Uttar Pradesh through Jhansi. The train may take up to two days to complete the journey. It travels through Uttar Pradesh, Madhya Pradesh & Gujarat.

History 

On 27 February 2002, the train was stopped outside Godhra Junction railway station because of the emergency chain being pulled. The train was then attacked.

58 Hindu pilgrims who were returning from the holy city of Ayodhya, were trapped and killed in the burning train. That incident is perceived as the trigger for the widespread 2002 Gujarat riots that followed in Godhra as well as the rest of Gujarat in which more than a thousand individuals died, thousands more were rendered homeless and property worth hundreds of crores was lost.

Route & Halts 

The important halts of the train are :-
 
 
 
 
 
 
 
 
 
 
 
 ASHOKNAGAR
 
 
 
 
 
 
 
 
 
 Shahganj Junction

Coach composite 

The train consists of 22 coaches:
 1 AC II Tier
 2 AC III Tier
 13 Sleeper coaches
 4 General
 2 Second-class Luggage/parcel van

Traction

As the route is fully electrified, it is hauled by a Vadodara Electric Loco Shed-based WAP-7 locomotive for its entire journey.

Schedule

Direction reversal

The train reverses its direction 2 times:

Rake sharing

The train shares its rake with 19165/19166 Ahmedabad–Darbhanga Sabarmati Express

See also 
 Ahmedabad–Darbhanga Sabarmati Express
 2002 Gujarat riots
 Godhra Junction railway station

References

Rail transport in Gujarat
Rail transport in Madhya Pradesh
Transport in Ahmedabad
Passenger trains originating from Varanasi
Named passenger trains of India
Express trains in India